Bather is a surname. Notable people with that surname include:

 Francis Arthur Bather (1863–1934), British paleontologist, geologist, and malacologist
 Elizabeth Bather (1904–1988), British Air Force officer and police officer
 Edward Bather (1779–1847), Archdeacon of Salop
 William Bather (1861–1939), English cricketer